Francis Richard Maunsell (1861–1936)  was a diplomat, amateur archaeologist, cartographer, and officer in the British Army, having served in intelligence and concentrated in the Middle East from the late nineteenth century until the early part of the twentieth century.

References 

1929 deaths
1861 births
British Army officers
British cartographers
20th-century British diplomats